Gheorghe Stratulat (born 13 March 1976) is a Moldovan former football player. He is also a former member of the Moldova national football team, making 16 appearances from 1998 to 2001. At the moment he is a FIFA-licensed players' agent.

Early life
Stratulat graduated the sportive high school from Chisinau, in 1994. In 1994–1999, he graduated from the Academy of Economy from Moldova.

Club career

F.C. Zimbru Chisinau, Moldova
With Zimbru Chisinau, he became the champion of Moldova, as senior and he won the Moldavian Cup.

F.C. Nistru Otaci, Moldova
With Nistru Otaci, he played two times in the final of Moldavian Cup.

F.C. Politehnica Timișoara, Romania

F.C. Dnipro Dnipropetrovsk, Ukraine
At Dnipro Dnipropetrovsk, Stratulat played in the period when he was disputed by Andrei Shevchenko, Revbrov Kaladze from Dinamo, Kiev.
After playing the match with Dinamo, Kiev and also with Shakhtar Donetsk, Gheorghe Stratulat was named the best player of the match.

F.C. Alania Vladikavkaz, Russia
With Alania Vladikavkaz he played in all the European Cups. In that period, Alania was one of the best club in the Russian Premier League.

Zob Ahan Esfahan, Iran
With Zob Ahan, from Iran, he won the Iranian Cup and got second place in Pro League. He participated also with Zobahan at the Champions League of Asia. Zobohan Esfahan, Iran is one of the best football clubs from Iran and Asia, showing its value with the best performances at the Champions League of Asia. On 2010–2011's edition Zob Ahan played the final of the Champions League from Asia.

Personal life
Stratulat is married and has two children.

References

External links

divizianationala.com
eurofotbal.info 

Moldovan footballers
Moldova international footballers
Moldovan expatriate footballers
FC Spartak Vladikavkaz players
Zob Ahan Esfahan F.C. players
Expatriate footballers in Iran
1976 births
Living people
Expatriate footballers in Romania
Liga II players
Shahrdari Bandar Abbas players
FC Dnipro players
FC Zimbru Chișinău players
FC Politehnica Timișoara players
Russian Premier League players
Ukrainian Premier League players
Moldovan expatriate sportspeople in Ukraine
Association football midfielders